Senator Lujan may refer to:

Ben Ray Luján (born 1972), United States Senate
David Lujan (born 1965), Arizona State Senate
Manuel U. Lujan (1912–1975), Senate of Guam
Pilar C. Lujan, Senate of Guam